In the French armed forces (and in the armed forces of former French colonies such as the armed forces of Niger), Chef d'escadron ("squadron leader") is the title of a commandant (major) in the Cavalry, Artillery and Baggage Train Corps and in the Gendarmerie.

In the Armoured Cavalry Corps, the equivalent rank is Chef d'escadrons, in the Infantry and the Combat Engineer Corps, it is Chef de bataillon.

Confusingly, escadrons in the actual French army's Armour and Baggage Train Corps are company equivalents and therefore typically commanded by a capitaine.

See also 
Chef d'escadre - the ancien Régime equivalent of rear admiral rank.

Sources 

Military ranks of France